George Pitts (né George Edward Pitts, Jr.; September 10, 1951 – March 4, 2017) was a Brooklyn-based photographer.

Career 
Pitts was, in 1993, the founding Director of Photography at Vibe Magazine, and served in that role until 2004. He was an assistant professor of Photography at Parsons School of Design.  In 2004, he became the Director of Photography at Life magazine. His work has been published by The New York Times Magazine, Werk, New York Magazine, S Magazine and Complex. In addition to his photography, Pitts was also a writer, poet and painter. His writing and art have appeared in Big magazine, S magazine, The Paris Review and other locations. In 2006, he received the Lucie Award for Picture Editor of the Year.

Education 
From September 1969 to December 1969; Pitts studied Art, Creative writing, and Literature at Howard University. In 1971, Pitts won a 1st Prize while studying at the Skowhegan School of Painting and Sculpture in Skowhegan, Maine. In 1973, he earned a Bachelor of Arts degree from Bennington College.

Death 
Pitts died on March 4, 2017, after a long illness.

Family 
Pitts was the son of newspaper journalist George Edward Pitts, Sr. (1925–1987), and Phyllis Forbes (maiden; 1931–2008).

References

1951 births
2017 deaths
Skowhegan School of Painting and Sculpture alumni
American photographers
Bennington College alumni
Howard University alumni